The AEG G.II was a German biplane bomber aircraft of World War I developed from the AEG G.I, with more powerful engines. The G.II was typically armed with three 7.92 mm (.312 in) machine guns and 200 kg (440 lb) of bombs. The bomber suffered stability problems, and many G.IIs were fitted with additional vertical tail surfaces on each side of the fin and rudder to improve flight handling characteristics.

This aircraft was the first assignment of Baron Von Richtofen prior to becoming a pilot.

Specifications (AEG G.II)

See also

References

 Taylor, John W. R., and Jean Alexander. "Combat Aircraft of the World" New York: G.P. Putnam's Sons, 1969 Library of Congress Catalog Card Number 68-25459 (Pg.134-135)

Further reading

 Kroschel, Günter; Stützer, Helmut: Die deutschen Militärflugzeuge 1910-18, Wilhelmshaven 1977
 Munson, Kenneth: Bomber 1914–19, Zürich 1968, Nr. 20
 Nowarra, Heinz: Die Entwicklung der Flugzeuge 1914-18, München 1959
 Sharpe, Michael: Doppeldecker, Dreifachdecker & Wasserflugzeuge, Gondrom, Bindlach 2001, 

G.II
1910s German bomber aircraft
Aircraft first flown in 1915